The Fire Ship is a 1922 German silent drama film directed by Richard Löwenbein and starring Camilla von Hollay, Eduard von Winterstein, and Viggo Larsen.

The film's sets were designed by the art director Jack Winter.

Cast

References

Bibliography

External links

1922 films
Films of the Weimar Republic
German silent feature films
German black-and-white films
1922 drama films
German drama films
Films directed by Richard Löwenbein
Phoebus Film films
Silent drama films
1920s German films
1920s German-language films